The Augsburg textile and industry museum, known by its acronym tim, is a museum in Augsburg a city in the south-west of Bavaria, Germany. It is situated in the Augsburger Kammgarnspinnerei, a former worsted spinning mill.
The museum is an Anchor point on the European Route of Industrial Heritage.

History
Augsburg had a thriving textile industry in the nineteenth century. The Augsburg Worsted Spinning Mill (Augsburger Kammgarnspinnerei — AKS) was founded in 1836 by Johann Anton Friedrich Merz. It was the first major industrial company in the city: it employed up to 2000 workers. It was the largest worsted spinning mill in the Federal Republic of Germany. It closed in 2004.

Museum

The mill was restored by Klaus Kada from Graz in Austria. It opened as a museum in 2010. Former textile workers had realised that the industry was disappearing and formed an association to rescue redundant equipment the museum displays this collection. It covers the complete production cycle: from raw materials to designer fashions.
A central piece in the museum is the NAK sample book, a collection of 1.3 million fabric designs from the 1780s to the 1990s.

The museum organises its displays under the headings Mensch-Maschine-Muster-Mode. That is
Mensch – The stories of the workers in this industry with living testament.
Maschine – In the machine hall is a working display of machines from across the ages, from hand to powerloom, producing a limited run of contemporary fabrics.
Muster – concentrates on the pattern book
Mode – shows the fashions from 'Biedermeier to Strenesse-Kleid'. Modern fabric are represented, stressing the opportunities for the Bayern economy.
There are also special exhibitions.

See also

Cotton-spinning machinery
European Route of Industrial Heritage
Textile

References

External links

  

Augsburg
Museums in Bavaria
Industry museums in Germany
European Route of Industrial Heritage Anchor Points
Textile museums in Germany